Moscow State Art and Cultural University is a Russian university, a vocational training center in the field of culture and art, located in the Levoberezhny District, Khimki, Moscow Oblast. It is under control of the Ministry of Culture of the Russian Federation.

History
Created by the decision of the Sovnarkom July 10, 1930, on the initiative of Nadezhda Krupskaya as the Moscow Library Institute. The first director was Henrietta Karlovna Derman. The first building of the institute was in the center of Moscow on Moss Street. In 1936, the Institute moved to the town of Khimki. In 1940 he became a state, in the period 1940–1957 years was named Molotov. In 1964 it was transformed into the Moscow State Institute of Culture. In 1980, the university was awarded the Order of the Red Banner. In 1994 he received university status and in 1999 renamed the Moscow State University of Culture and Arts (MGUKI). In 1994 the University has been identified as a basic school, where it was created by a teaching union of Russian higher educational institutions on education in traditional art and culture, socio-cultural activities and information resources. It consists of five teaching tips for eight specialties and training. Teaching union constantly interacts with the 61 Russian university.

External links
 Official website of the Moscow State Art and Cultural University

Universities and colleges in Moscow
Universities and institutes established in the Soviet Union
Educational institutions established in 1930
1930 establishments in the Soviet Union